Songjiang Tram (also Songjiang Tramway) is a light rail tramway in Shanghai, China. The system consists of two lines (T1 and T2) totaling  with 42 stations. Unlike the Zhangjiang Tram, Songjiang trams use centenary power supply and steel-wheeled rail systems. Most of them use independent rights of way. The intersection signal lights were adjusted through the system to make them pass first, and the running speed reaches 25-30km/h. Trains run from 6:00 till 22:00. With further extension of the network public transport modal split in Songjiang is expected from the current 23% to 40%.

The tram system is operated with 30 light rail vehicles (LRVs), while other 4 lines in development of line directions. Estimated ridership for the line is 170,000 passengers per day.

A joint venture between Shanghai Shentong Metro Group and Keolis’ Chinese joint venture, Shanghai Keolis, with Shanghai Shentong Metro Group holding 51%, has been awarded a five-year contract to operate and maintain the line.

Pricing schedule 
The fee is 2 yuan within 10 kilometers (inclusive); for the part above 10 kilometers, every 10 kilometers (inclusive) is a pricing section, and each section is charged at 1 yuan. Children under 1.3m in height travel for free (accompanied by an adult).

Each station of Songjiang Tram is equipped with an automatic ticket vending machine. Shanghai Public Transport Card (physical card and mobile phone transportation card) can enjoy preferential transfers. The transfer discount policy for Shanghai public transport service is applicable.

History

Opening timeline 

Note: The first phase of Songjiang Tram T2 Line includes Songjiang Tram T5 Line Thames Town West Station-North Sanxin Road Station. After the completion of Songjiang Tram T5 Line, this section will be operated by Songjiang Tram T5 Line.

The first  section of the system, with 20 stations, opened on 26 December 2018.

A  section (including the remaining section of T2, and part of T1) opened on 10 August 2019.

The remaining section of T1 (from Xinqiao Railway Station to Xinmiaosan Road) opened on 30 December 2019.

In 2020, the Songjiang tram T2 line construction project won the 2018-2019 Shanghai Municipal Engineering Gold Award.

The opening time of Chenta Road station on T1 is still unknown.

Passenger flow 
From December 26, 2018 to February 9, 2019, the total passenger flow of Songjiang tram T2 line reached 478,334, and the average daily passenger flow was 10,398.
 From December 26, 2018 to April 4, 2019, Songjiang tram T2 line transported a total of 1.084 million passengers, with an average daily passenger flow of 10,845, of which a single-day passenger flow reached 20,314 on December 31, 2018.
 From the opening of trial operation on December 26, 2018 to June 25, 2019 the total number of passengers carried was 2,108,687, the average daily passenger flow was 11,586, and the maximum passenger flow in a single day was 20,478.
 In 2021 the total passenger flow of the two lines is 9.1778 million; the average daily passenger flow of the two lines 25,100 passengers, and the highest passenger flow in a single day occurred on December 31, 2021, with 38,000 passengers.

Stations

Songjiang Tram T1

Songjiang Tram T2
The current operating mileage is about 14.0 kilometers  with 20 stations (excluding the common line section).

Future expansion

Under construction
The west extension of the T2 line started construction on 19 February 2021 runs from Sanxin North Road to Xiangkun Road, with a total of 9 stations, with a total length of about 7.4 kilometers. The line runs along Xinsongjiang Road, Wensong Road, Dingsheng Road, and Wenxiang Road from east to west, with a total of Sanxin North Road Station, Chenta Road Station, Dingyuan Road Station, Dingsong Road Station, Dingwen Road Station, and Dingsheng Road. 9 stations including Lu Station, Hexi Street Station, Kunde Road Station and Xiangkun Road Station.

In order to meet the needs of line parking and operation management, it is proposed to set up a Xiaokunshan parking lot, located at the starting point of the western section of the second phase of the project, at the northwest corner of the Xiangkun intersection of Wenxiang Road, with a total land area of approximately 0.97 hectares. At the same time, in order to ensure the operation needs of the west extension of the T2 line, a total of 5 substations have been set up across the line, of which one civil substation is combined with a parking lot, and the other 4 are box-type substations.

Future plans
Eventually the plans call for 7 tram lines with a total length of about 150km.

Technology

Depots and Parking Lots
 Chenta Road Depot is a depot for Songjiang Tram Line T1. It has inspection lines and temporary repair lines, and can also carry out work such as tram frame overhaul. Up to 77 trains can be parked.
 Xinqiao parking lot is a parking lot of Songjiang tram line T1, which can park 8 trains.
 Songjiang University Town parking lot is a parking lot of Songjiang Tram Line T2. It has inspection lines and temporary repair lines. It can also receive new cars, repaired cars, and complete train repairs. Up to 33 trains can be parked.

Rolling Stock
A joint venture of Alstom and Shanghai Rail Traffic Equipment Development Company was awarded a €72 million contract in April 2015 to supply 30 Alstom Citadis 302 trams. The first Silkworm low-floor LRV was delivered on 21 November 2016. The trams can carry 300 passengers.

See also

References

External links
T2 tram line on the right tracks after trial test run - 11 October 2017 test run

Transport in Shanghai
Tram transport in China
Songjiang District